"Go Away" (Korean: 고어웨이) is a song by South Korean girl group 2NE1 from their first studio album To Anyone (2010). The original Korean version was released as the lead single from the album on September 9, 2010. It was produced and written by Teddy Park, with additional Japanese lyrics written by Shoko Fujibayashi. The song was released in Japan on November 16, 2011, as the group's debut single for their first Japanese studio album Collection, which was released on March 28, 2012.

The song was a commercial success in South Korea, achieving the number one spot on both the weekly and monthly Gaon Digital Charts and was ranked the fourth best-performing single overall in the country in 2010. As of 2013, "Go Away" had received more than 2,900,000 digital downloads. In Japan, the song peaked at number nine on the daily Oricon Singles Chart and sold more than 21,000 physical copies. Two music videos were produced in Korean and Japanese to promote the singles.

Background and promotion

The song was produced by Teddy Park, who served as the lead producer for 2NE1's previous extended play 2NE1. Musically, the song is composed in the key of B major with a tempo of 128 beats per minute, and has a runtime of 3:36. "Go Away" was promoted as part of the triple "title tracks" series for To Anyone, alongside "Clap Your Hands" and "Can't Nobody". Prior to the album's release, teasers for the song were released on YG Life leading up to the album's release. The album, along with the single "Go Away" and its Korean music video was released simultaneously on September 9, 2010. The single was promoted on several music programs until the promotions for the album's next single, "It Hurts (Slow)".

The song was the second 2NE1 song to be released as a ringtone in Japan, after "Can't Nobody (English Version)," in March 2011. A Japanese version of the song was first announced in late March, after it was announced as the theme song for the Fuji TV early morning news program Mezanyū. It was used as the theme song between April 1 and October 1, 2011. 

The Japanese version of "Go Away" was announced in September 2011 as the group's debut physical single in Japan, after the group's three digital singles and extended play Nolza released earlier in the year. The single was released by YGEX on November 16, 2011, along with the Japanese-language version of the group's song "It Hurts" as the single's B-side.

Music video

Background
The Korean music video for the song is six minutes long and was directed by Cha Eun-taek. It was filmed in August 2010 and was released on September 9, 2010. The video won "Favorite K-pop Video" at the Myx Music Awards 2011. A Japanese version of the music video was released by YGEX along with the single. The short version of the Japanese music video was uploaded to the group's official YouTube channel on November 17, 2011.

Synopsis
The Korean music video opens with CL in a cafe with her boyfriend (Song Jae-rim). CL's boyfriend is stressed out about dating her still and calls off the relationship, telling her not to mess with him anymore or else he'd kill her before getting up. CL wants him to stay and grabs his hand, but he lets go and leaves. A distressed CL puts her glasses on, bumps into a girl, then accidentally bangs into a door. Minzy is waiting for her outside in her car, then CL drives off. It begins to rain and CL throws a relationship ring out of the car. In the chorus, CL is at the racetrack getting ready to race and sees her ex-boyfriend who is also wearing a race uniform with a new girl. The two race against each other but her ex-boyfriend wins, because she hesitated when he almost crashed into her. Intercut in the race are scenes of Dara and Bom. The next chorus shows Dara drinking with a devastated CL with Minzy outside the cafe standing in rain with an umbrella. Flashbacks of CL and her ex boyfriend in happier times are shown in between. Next all of the members are playing in a band in a garage with Bom playing the keyboard, Minzy on the drums, CL on the microphone, and Dara on the guitar. 

The next scene shows a drunk CL going to the house of her ex-boyfriend. CL knocks on the door and her ex-boyfriend tries to ignore her while his new girl is involved. CL gets angry and kicks the door. Her ex-boyfriend opens the door and drags her away. CL states about the jacket she gave to him to where her ex slaps her and starts shouting at her that she needs to stop messing with him. He throws the jacket onto the ground and leaves as CL got a bruise on her cheek. The other members come and help her get up. In the third chorus, CL has come to the racetrack again with an obvious bruise on her cheek she got from the fight and races against her ex-boyfriend once more. At the last minute of the race, with tears on her face, CL bumps her ex-boyfriend's car and they both push against each other. CL's black car flies into the air then bumps into her ex-boyfriend's car again. The cars explode and start a fire. In the last scene, CL is re-covered and standing with the other members, dressed in black, looking at the car. They all turn and comfort CL, smiling as they walk away.

Reception
As with the rest of the To Anyone album, the overall response was favorable. "Go Away" topped various online charts along with the other two title tracks. On the official South Korean singles chart, it debuted at number eight on September 11, 2010. By the eighteenth, it had reached number one where it stayed in the top position for two weeks. It was replaced by "It's You" by Sung Si Kyung featuring IU. On the monthly chart, it captured the number one spot for the month of September, where it was then replaced by "Then Then Then" by Supreme Team featuring Young Jun. At the end of the year, the song placed fourth overall for all songs released in South Korea. It achieved 2,444,933 downloads and 24,516,687 streams, enabling it to place 16th and 14th on the downloads and streaming chart, respectively. 

"Go Away" was named the third most downloaded ringtone in South Korea in 2010, and the first by a female artist, with over 547,000 ringtone downloads. As of 2013, the song garnered over 2,900,000 units in digital sales in the country (excluding ringtones). In Japan, it has sold more than 21,150 physical copies since release in 2011.

Live performances
The song was performed as one of three promotional singles through the month of September along with "Clap Your Hands" and "Can't Nobody". It was performed on the four main music programs in South Korea: M! Countdown, Music Bank, Inkigayo, and Show! Music Core. The group began Japanese promotions for their debut single by performing the song at Happy Music on November 21, 2011.

Accolades

The song won Song of the Month (September) from the Cyworld Digital Music Awards, and was nominated for Song of the Year at the 2010 Melon Music Awards. In addition, the group won three mutizens for the song on the Korean music programs Inkigayo and Music Bank.

Track listing

 Digital download
 "Go Away" – 3:36
 Japanese edition
 "Go Away" - 3:35
 "It Hurts" - 4:15
 "Go Away" (Instrumental) - 3:35
 "It Hurts" (Instrumental) - 4:15

Personnel
 Teddy Park – arranger, composer, lyricist
 CL – vocalist, rapper
 Bom – vocalist
 Dara – vocalist
 Minzy – vocalist
 Shōko Fujibayashi – lyricist (Japanese version)

Charts

Weekly charts

Monthly charts

Year-end charts

Sales

Release history

Notes

References

External links
 

2010 singles
2011 singles
2NE1 songs
Songs with feminist themes
Korean-language songs
Japanese-language songs
YG Entertainment singles
Songs written by Teddy Park
Songs with lyrics by Shoko Fujibayashi
Gaon Digital Chart number-one singles
2010 songs